Ratko Mladić (born 12 March 1942) is a Bosnian Serb former military officer and convicted war criminal who led the Army of Republika Srpska (VRS) during the Yugoslav Wars. In 2017, he was found guilty of committing war crimes, crimes against humanity, and genocide by the International Criminal Tribunal for the former Yugoslavia (ICTY). 

A long-time member of the League of Communists of Yugoslavia, Mladić began his career in the Yugoslav People's Army (JNA) in 1965. He came to prominence in the Yugoslav Wars, initially as a high-ranking officer of the Yugoslav People's Army and subsequently as the Chief of the General Staff of the Army of Republika Srpska in the Bosnian War of 1992–1995.
In July 1996 the Trial Chamber of the ICTY, proceeding in the absence of Mladić under the ICTY's Rule 61, confirmed all counts of the original indictments, finding there were reasonable grounds to believe he had committed the alleged crimes, and issued an international arrest warrant. The Serbian and United States' governments offered €5 million for information leading to Mladić's capture and arrest. Mladić nevertheless managed to remain at large for nearly sixteen years, initially sheltered by Serbian and Bosnian Serb security forces and later by family. On 26 May 2011, he was arrested in Lazarevo, Serbia. His capture was considered to be one of the pre-conditions for Serbia being awarded candidate status for European Union membership.

On 31 May 2011, Mladić was extradited to the Hague, where he was processed at the detention center that holds suspects for the ICTY. His trial formally began in The Hague on 16 May 2012. On 22 November 2017, Mladić was sentenced to life in prison by the ICTY after being found guilty of 10 charges, one of genocide, five of crimes against humanity and four of violations of the laws or customs of war. He was cleared of one count of genocide. As the top military officer with command responsibility, Mladić was deemed by the ICTY to be responsible for both the siege of Sarajevo and the Srebrenica massacre.

Early life and military career
Mladić was born in Božanovići, Independent State of Croatia (present-day Bosnia and Herzegovina), on 12 March 1942.

His father Neđa (1909–1945) was a member of the Yugoslav Partisans. His mother, Stana (née Lalović; 1919–2003), raised her three children; daughter Milica (born 1940), sons Ratko and Milivoje (1944–2001), by herself after the death of her husband in 1945 during World War II. Bosnia and Herzegovina was at the time part of the Independent State of Croatia, a fascist state led by the Croatian Ustaše between 1941 and 1945, created after Nazi Germany and Fascist Italy invaded and partitioned the Kingdom of Yugoslavia in 1941. Mladić's father Neđa was killed in action (on Mladić's third birthday) while leading a Partisan attack on the home village of Ustaše leader Ante Pavelić in 1945.

Upon finishing elementary school, Mladić worked in Sarajevo as a whitesmith for the Tito Company. He entered the Military Industry School in Zemun in 1961. He then went on to the KOV Military Academy and the Officers Academy thereafter. Upon graduating on 27 September 1965, Mladić began his career in the Yugoslav People's Army. In the same year he joined the League of Communists of Yugoslavia, remaining a member until the party disintegrated in 1990.

Mladić began his first post as an officer in Skopje on 4 November 1965, where he was the commander of and youngest soldier in his unit. Beginning with the rank of second lieutenant in April 1968, he proved himself to be a capable officer, first commanding a platoon (May 1970), then a battalion (27 November 1974), and then a brigade. In September 1976, Mladić began his higher military education at the "Komandno-štabne akademije" in Belgrade, finishing in first place with a grade of 9.57 (out of 10). 

On 25 December 1980, Mladić became a lieutenant colonel. Then, on 18 August 1986, he became a colonel, based in Štip. He finished an additional year of military education in September 1986. On 31 January 1989, he was promoted to the head of the Education Department of the Third Military District of Skopje. On 14 January 1991, he was promoted again, to Deputy Commander in Priština.

Role in the Yugoslav Wars 

 
In June 1991, Mladić was promoted to Deputy Commander of the Priština Corps in the Socialist Autonomous Province of Kosovo at a time of high tension between Kosovo Serbs and Kosovo's majority Albanian population. That year, Mladić was given command of the 9th Corps, and led this formation against Croatian forces in Knin, the capital of the self-declared Republic of Serbian Krajina. 

On 4 October 1991, Mladić was promoted to major general. The JNA forces under his command participated in the Croatian War, notably during Operation Coast-91 in an attempt to cut off Dalmatia from the rest of Croatia, which resulted in a stalemate (the Croats held the entire coastline near Zadar and Šibenik, and Serb Krajina expanded its territory in the hinterland). Among other early operations, Mladić aided Milan Martić's militia in the 1991 siege of Kijevo and the battle of Zadar.

On 24 April 1992, Mladić was promoted to the rank of lieutenant colonel general. On 2 May 1992, one month after Bosnia and Hercegovina's declaration of independence, Mladić and his generals blockaded the city of Sarajevo, shutting off all traffic in and out of the city, as well as water and electricity. This began the four-year Siege of Sarajevo, the longest siege of a city in the history of modern warfare. The city was bombarded with shells and sniper shooting. On 9 May 1992, he assumed the post of Chief of Staff/Deputy Commander of the Second Military District Headquarters of the JNA in Sarajevo. The next day, Mladić assumed the command of the Second Military District Headquarters of the JNA. On 12 May 1992, in response to Bosnia's secession from Yugoslavia, the Bosnian Serb Parliament voted to create the Army of Republika Srpska (VRS, in short). At the same time, Mladić was appointed Commander of the Main Staff of the VRS, a position he held until December 1996. During the 16th session of the Bosnian-Serb Assembly on 12 May 1992, Radovan Karadžić announced his "six strategic objectives", including "Demarcation of the state as separate from the other two national communities", "A corridor between Semberija and Krajina" and "Establishment of a corridor in the Drina river valley, and the eradication of the Drina river as a border between the Serbian states." Mladić then said:

In May 1992, after the withdrawal of JNA forces from Bosnia, the JNA Second Military District became the nucleus of the Main Staff of the VRS. On 24 June 1994, he was promoted to the rank of colonel general over approximately 80,000 troops stationed in the area.

In July 1995, troops commanded by Mladić, harried by NATO air strikes intended to force compliance with a UN ultimatum to remove heavy weapons from the Sarajevo area, overran and occupied the UN "safe areas" of Srebrenica and Žepa. At Srebrenica over 40,000 Bosniaks who had sought safety there were expelled. An estimated 8,300 were murdered, on Mladić's order.
On 4 August 1995, with a huge Croatian military force poised to attack the Serb-held region in central Croatia, Radovan Karadžić announced he was removing Mladić from his post and assuming personal command of the VRS himself. Karadžić blamed Mladić for the loss of two key Serb towns in western Bosnia that had recently fallen to the Croatian army, and he used the loss of the towns as an excuse to announce his surprising changes in the command structure. Mladić was demoted to an "adviser". He refused to go quietly, claiming the support of both the Bosnian Serb military as well as the people. Karadžić countered by denouncing Mladić as a "madman" and attempting to remove his political rank, but Mladić's obvious popular support forced Karadžić to rescind his order on 11 August. His actions during the war led to many dubbing him "The Butcher of Bosnia".

Several of Mladić's conversations were recorded during the war:

On 8 November 1996, Biljana Plavšić, the president of the Bosnian Serb Republic, dismissed Mladić from his post. He continued to receive a pension until November 2005.

Indictment by the ICTY 

On 24 July 1995, Mladić was indicted by the International Criminal Tribunal for the Former Yugoslavia (ICTY) for genocide, crimes against humanity, and numerous war crimes (including crimes relating to the alleged sniping campaign against civilians in Sarajevo). On 16 November 1995, the charges were expanded to include charges of war crimes for the attack on the UN-declared safe area of Srebrenica in July 1995. 

A fugitive from the ICTY, he was suspected to be hiding either in Serbia or in Republika Srpska. Mladić was reportedly seen attending a football match between China and Yugoslavia in Belgrade in March 2000. He entered through a VIP entrance and sat in a private box surrounded by eight armed bodyguards. There were claims that he had been seen in a suburb of Moscow, and that he "regularly" visited Thessaloniki and Athens, which raised suspicions that numerous fake reports were sent to cover his trail. Some reports said that he took refuge in his wartime bunker in Han Pijesak, not far from Sarajevo, or in Montenegro. 

In early February 2006, portions of a Serbian military intelligence report were leaked to Serbian newspaper Politika which stated that Mladić had been hidden in Army of Republika Srpska and Yugoslav army facilities up until 1 June 2002, when the National Assembly of Serbia passed a law mandating cooperation with the ICTY in The Hague. The then-Chief General of the Yugoslav Army Nebojša Pavković requested that Mladić vacate the facility where he was staying on mountain Povlen, near Valjevo, after which the Serb military agencies claim to have lost all trace of him.

Initially, Mladić lived freely in Belgrade. After the arrest of Slobodan Milošević in 2001, Mladić went into hiding, but he was still protected by Serb security services and the army. Serbia's failure to bring Mladić to justice seriously harmed its relationship with the European Union.

In 2004, Paddy Ashdown, then-United Nations High Representative in Bosnia and Herzegovina, removed 58 officials from their posts due to suspicions that they helped war crimes suspects including Mladić and Karadžić to evade capture. Some officials were subjected to travel bans and had their bank accounts frozen. The ban was later lifted after the capture of Mladić.

In November 2004, British defense officials conceded that military action was unlikely to be successful in bringing Mladić and other suspects to trial. One winter's day British UN troops carrying sidearms were confronted by the general skiing down the piste at Sarajevo's former Olympic skiing resort but made no move for their guns; skiing behind Mladić were four bodyguards. Despite his Hague warrant, the British soldiers decided to carry on skiing. NATO later sent commandos to arrest various war crimes suspects, but Mladić simply went underground. No amount of NATO action or UN demands, or even a $5 million bounty announced by Washington, could bring him in.

It was revealed in December 2004 that the Army of Republika Srpska had been harboring and protecting Mladić until the summer of 2004, despite repeated and public pleas to collaborate with the ICTY and apprehend war criminals. On 6 December, NATO said that Mladić visited his wartime bunker during the summer in order to celebrate Army of Republika Srpska Day.

In June 2005, The Times newspaper alleged that Mladić had demanded a $5 million (£2.75 million) "compensation" to be given to his family and bodyguards if he gave himself up to the ICTY in the Hague. In January 2006, a Belgrade court indicted 10 people for aiding Mladić in hiding from 2002 to January 2006. An investigation showed Mladić spent his time in New Belgrade, a suburb of the capital.

It was erroneously reported on 21 February 2006 that Mladić had been arrested in Belgrade and was being transferred via Tuzla to the ICTY war tribunal. The arrest was denied by the Serbian government. The government did not deny rumors of a planned negotiated surrender between Mladić and Serbian special forces. Romanian government and Serbian sources claimed on 22 February 2006 that Mladić was arrested in Romania, near Drobeta-Turnu Severin, close to the Serbian border by a joint Romanian-British special operation carried out by troops of those respective countries. However, ICTY Prosecutor Carla Del Ponte denied the rumors that Mladić had been arrested, saying that they had "absolutely no basis whatsoever". Del Ponte urged the Serbian government to locate him without further delay, saying Mladić was in reach of the Serbian authorities and had been in Serbia since 1998. She said a failure to capture him would harm Serbia's bid to join the European Union (EU). 1 May 2006 deadline established by Del Ponte for Serbia to hand over Mladić passed, resulting in talks between Serbia and the EU being suspended. The EU considered Mladić's arrest, along with full cooperation with the ICTY, pre-conditions that had to be met before Serbia could join the organization.

In July 2008, Serbian officials voiced concern that Mladić would order or had ordered his bodyguards to kill him to prevent him from being captured to face trial.

Based on a March 2009 poll of the NGO Strategic Marketing for the television station B92, which involved 1,050 respondents, 14% of Serbia's citizens would reveal information that would lead to his arrest in exchange for €1 million, 21% did not have a determined attitude, and 65% would not divulge information for €1 million (the poll was conducted when the United States embassy issued a reward of €1.3 million for any information on Mladić). However, it was noted that the formulation of the question might have been a problem, as the polling samples which opted "No" included also those who would immediately report Mladić without payment, believing that payment in this case is immoral. Although preceding reports indicated that 47% supported the extradition, it was apparent that most of the population was against it. According to a poll conducted by the National Committee for Cooperation with the ICTY, 78% of those polled would not report Mladić to the authorities, with 40% believing that he is a hero. Only 34% said they would approve of Mladić's arrest.

On 11 June 2009, a Bosnian television station broadcast videos of Mladić, filmed over the previous decade. The last video that was featured in the show 60 Minuta showed Mladić with two women, allegedly filmed in the winter of 2008. However, no evidence for this was given by television presenters. Serbia stated that it was "impossible" for the videos to have been filmed in 2008. Rasim Ljajić, Serbia's minister in charge of co-operation with the UN tribunal, confirmed that the footage was old and had already been handed over to the ICTY in March 2009. Ljajić claimed "the last known footage was taken eight years ago. The last time Mladić was in military premises was at the Krcmari army barracks near [the western Serbian town of] Valjevo on 1 June 2002." The previously unseen images show Mladić in various restaurants and apartments and at what appears to be military barracks in Serbia, almost always accompanied by his wife Bosa and son Darko.

On 16 June 2010, Mladić's family filed a request to declare him dead, claiming he had been in poor health and absent for seven years. If the declaration had been approved Mladić's wife would have been able to collect a state pension and sell his property. At this time, Mladić was hiding in a house owned by his family.

In October 2010, Serbia intensified the hunt by increasing the reward for Mladić's capture from €5 million to €10 million.

Arrest, trial and conviction 

Mladić was arrested on 26 May 2011 in Lazarevo, northern Serbia. His arrest was carried out by two dozen Serbian special police officers wearing black uniforms and masks, and not wearing any insignia. The police were accompanied by Security Information Agency and War Crimes Prosecutor's Office agents. The officers entered the village in four SUVs in the early morning hours while most residents were still asleep. They pulled up to four houses simultaneously, each owned by Mladić's relatives. Mladić was about to venture into the yard for a walk after being awakened by pain, when four officers jumped over the fence and broke into the house just as he moved toward the door, grabbing Mladić, forcing him to the floor, and demanding he identify himself. Mladić identified himself correctly, and surrendered two pistols he had been carrying. He was then taken to Belgrade. Mladić was arrested in the house of his cousin Branislav Mladić, at the Vuka Karadžića st. 2. 

Branislav had been identified as a possible suspect at least two months before, and had been under surveillance right up to his arrest. After some initial doubt as to the identity of the arrested, Serbian President Boris Tadić confirmed it was Mladić at a press conference and announced that the process of extraditing him to the ICTY was underway. Mladić had been using the pseudonym "Milorad Komadić" while in hiding. Mladić was not wearing a beard or any disguise. His appearance reportedly showed he had "aged considerably", and one of his arms was paralyzed due to a series of strokes.

Following his arrest, Mladić appeared before the Belgrade Higher Court for a hearing on whether he was fit to be extradited to The Hague. Judge Milan Dilparić suspended interrogation due to his poor health. Mladić's lawyer Miloš Šaljić said that his poor health prevented him from properly communicating. He was allegedly unable to confirm his personal data, but attempted to talk to the prosecutors on several occasions, especially to Deputy War Crimes Prosecutor Bruno Vekarić. 

However, the court ruled that he was fit to be extradited on 27 May. According to the Serbian Health Ministry, a team of prison doctors described his health as stable following checkups. Mladić was also visited in prison by Health Minister Zoran Stanković, a former friend. Mladić was extradited to The Hague on 31 May 2011, and his trial formally opened in The Hague on 16 May 2012. Mladić also survived a heart attack he had when in his detention unit on 23 December 2013.

Mladić was arrested on the same day that the EU's representative, Catherine Ashton, visited Belgrade. His arrest improved relations with the EU, which had been concerned that Serbia was sheltering Mladić. In July 2015 media said that he is "trying to find one Norwegian officer to have him come to The Hague to witness" in the trial.

In 2017, the International Criminal Tribunal for the former Yugoslavia (ICTY) convicted Mladić on 10 charges: one of genocide, five of crimes against humanity and four of violations of the laws or customs of war. He was cleared of one count of genocide. As a top military officer with command responsibility, Mladić was deemed, by the ICTY, to be responsible for both the siege of Sarajevo and the Srebrenica massacre. The ICTY sentenced Mladić to life imprisonment.

In 2018, during the appeals process, three out of the five judges on the appeals court were removed by the Mechanism for International Criminal Tribunals (MITC), because they "appear[ed] biased", considering that they had previously rendered certain conclusions linked to Mladić in other cases in The Hague.

In January 2019, the pre-appeals chamber partially granted a prosecution request and struck three of five motions which Mladić filed to submit new evidence. On 7 June 2019, Mladić requested to have an extension in his appeals motions, which was granted. On 13 June 2019, it was announced at a status conference that Mladić was diagnosed with "harmless arrhythmia" and scheduling for the potential appeals hearings still had not started either. On 10 July 2019, Mladić was hospitalized following a health scare, but was then discharged and transferred back to The Hague detention unit on 12 July after the illness was determined to be non-life-threatening and not a sign of increased heart problems. 

The first appeal hearing was held on 25 and 26 August 2020. On 3 September 2020, the five judge panel representing  the MITC's Appeals Chamber voted 4–1 to reject Mladić's request for future hospitalization outside his Hague detention center. On 8 June 2021, Mladić's final appeal was rejected, and his life imprisonment sentence confirmed.

Personal life

Mladić and his wife Bosiljka had two children; a son named Darko and a daughter named Ana. Ana died on 24 March 1994, aged 23, in an apparent suicide. She was not married and had no children. 

There were conflicting reports in various Serbian publications regarding Ana Mladić's death and the discovery of her body. Some media said that her body was found in her blood-splattered bedroom, and others claim it was found in a nearby park or in the woods near the Topčider cemetery. However, it was concluded that she had used her father's handgun, which he had been awarded at military school in his youth. There are also conflicting opinions on the reason for her suicide, with one of the more common theories being that she was under immense pressure from the general public as her father was frequently chided and scrutinized in the Serbian newspapers for his actions against civilians in Bosnia. There was another theory that stated that the reason for her suicide was the death of her boyfriend Dragan, who had been killed in the Bosnian War. Historian Jože Pirjevec supports this theory, writing that she killed herself to punish her father for sending her boyfriend to fight on the first line, where he was killed, and for failing to tell her about the boy's death.

References

ICTY

Further reading
 BOŽOVIĆ, MARIJETA, BOGDAN TRIFUNOVIĆ, and ALEKSANDAR BOŠKOVIĆ. "The arrest of Ratko Mladić online: Tracing memory models across digital genres." Digital Icons: Studies in Russian, Eurasian and Central European New Media 12 (2014): 77–104. online
 Dojčinović, Predrag. "In the mind of the crime: Proving the mens rea of genocidal intent in the words of Ratko Mladić and other members of the joint criminal enterprise." Propaganda and International Criminal Law ( Routledge, 2019) pp. 179–198.
 Flanery, Brady. "An Analysis of the Ratko Mladic Trial and the Struggle to Reach a Guilty Verdict for Perpetrators of Genocide." Indonesian journal of international & comparative law. 7 (2020): 75+.

 Fournet, Caroline. "‘Face to face with horror’: The Tomašica mass grave and the trial of Ratko Mladić." Human Remains and Violence: An Interdisciplinary Journal 6.2 (2020): 23–41. online
 Mulaj, Klejda. "Genocide and the ending of war: Meaning, remembrance and denial in Srebrenica, Bosnia." Crime, Law and Social Change 68.1–2 (2017): 123–143. online
 Trahan, Jennifer. "An Overview Of Justice In The Former Yugoslavia And Reflections For Accountability In Syria." ILSA Journal of International & Comparative Law 23.2 (2017): 4+. online

External links 

 Mladić (IT-09-92) at icty.org
The Trial of Ratko Mladić Daily reports at SENSE Transitional Justice Center
The Madness of General Mladic

Ratko Mladić collected news and commentary at Balkan Insight

|-

1943 births
Army of Republika Srpska soldiers
People from Kalinovik
People convicted by the International Criminal Tribunal for the former Yugoslavia
People indicted for genocide
Military personnel of the Bosnian War
Military personnel of the Croatian War of Independence
Bosnian genocide perpetrators
Serbian generals
Serbs of Bosnia and Herzegovina
Generals of the Yugoslav People's Army
Living people
People extradited from Serbia
Serbian nationalists
Serbs of Bosnia and Herzegovina convicted of genocide
Serbs of Bosnia and Herzegovina convicted of crimes against humanity
Serbs of Bosnia and Herzegovina convicted of war crimes
People indicted for war crimes